A drag queen is a person, usually male,  who uses drag clothing and makeup to imitate and often exaggerate female gender signifiers and gender roles for entertainment purposes. Historically, drag queens have usually been gay men, and part of gay culture. 

People do drag for reasons ranging from self-expression to mainstream performance. Drag shows frequently include lip-syncing, live singing, and dancing. They occur at events like LGBT pride parades, carnivals and drag pageants and especially in venues such as cabarets and nightclubs. Drag queens vary by type, culture, and dedication, from professionals who star in films and spend a lot of their time in their drag personas, to people who do drag only occasionally. Women who dress as men and entertain by imitating them are called drag kings.

Those who do occasional drag may be from other backgrounds than the LGBT community. There is a long history of folkloric and theatrical crossdressing that involves people of all orientations. Not everyone who does drag at some point in their lives is a drag queen or a drag king.

Terminology, scope and etymology

Drag queen
The origin of the term drag is uncertain; the first recorded use of drag in reference to actors dressed in women's clothing is from 1870. It may have been based on the term "grand rag" which was historically used for a masquerade ball.

In 1971, an article in Lee Brewster's Drag Queens magazine describes a drag queen as a "homosexual tranvestite" who is hyperfeminine, flamboyant, and militant. Drag queens are further described as having an attitude of superiority, and being commonly courted by heterosexual men who would "not ordinarily participate in homosexual relationships". The term drag queen implied "homosexual transvestite", but the term drag carried no such connotations. In the 1970s, drag queen is again defined as a "homosexual transvestite". Drag is parsed as changing one's clothes to those of a different sex, while queen is said to refer to a homosexual man.

For much of history, drag queens were men, but in more modern times, cisgender and trans women, as well as non-binary people, also perform as drag queens. In a 2018 article, Psychology Today stated that drag queens are "most typically gay cisgender men (though there are many drag queens of varying sexual orientations and gender identities)". 

Examples of trans-feminine drag queens, sometimes called trans queens, include Monica Beverly Hillz and Peppermint. Cisgender female drag queens are sometimes called faux queens or bioqueens, though critics of this practice assert that faux carries the connotation that the drag is fake, and that the use of bioqueen exclusively for cisgender females is a misnomer since trans-feminine queens exhibit gynomorphic features. 

Drag queens' counterparts are drag kings: performers, usually women, who dress in exaggeratedly masculine clothing. Examples of drag kings include Landon Cider. Trans men who dress like drag kings are sometimes termed trans kings. Drag has been argued to be an over-expression of the stereotypical female look. Drag is known to break down gender norms and can thus be seen as 'gender bending'.

Female impersonator
The term female impersonator was commonly used in the past. In 1972, Esther Newton described a female impersonator as a "professional drag queen". She considered the term female impersonator to be the one that was (then) widely understood by heterosexual audiences.

Female impersonation can be traced back at least as far as ancient Greece.  There was little to no gender equity then and women held a lower social status. This meant male actors would play female roles during theatrical performances.   This tradition continued for centuries but began to be less prevalent as motion pictures became popular.  During the era of vaudeville it was considered immodest for women to appear on stage.  Due to that circumstance, some men became famous as "female impersonators", the most notable being Julian Eltinge.  At the peak of his career he was one of the most sought after and highest paid actors in the world.

Female impersonation has been and continues to be illegal in some places, which inspired the drag queen José Sarria to hand out labels to his friends reading, "I am a boy", so they could not be accused of female impersonation. American drag queen RuPaul once said, "I do not impersonate females! How many women do you know who wear seven-inch heels, four-foot wigs, and skintight dresses?" He also said, "I don't dress like a woman; I dress like a drag queen!"

Alternative term

Some drag queens may prefer to be referred to as "she" while in drag and desire to stay completely in character. Other drag performers, like RuPaul, seem to be completely indifferent to which pronoun is used to refer to them. In his words, "You can call me he. You can call me she. You can call me Regis and Kathie Lee; I don't care! Just so long as you call me."

Drag queens are sometimes called transvestites, although that term also has many other connotations than the term drag queen and is not much favored by many drag queens themselves. The term tranny, an abbreviation of the term transvestite, has been adopted by some drag performers, notably RuPaul, and the gay male community in the United States, but it is considered offensive to most transgender and transsexual people.

Many drag performers refer to themselves as drag artists, as opposed to drag queens, as some contemporary forms of drag have become nonbinary.

Uncommon terms
In the drag queen world today, there is an ongoing debate about whether transgender drag queens are actually considered "Drag Queens". Some argue that, because a drag queen is defined as a man portraying a woman, transgender women cannot be drag queens. Drag kings are women who assume a masculine aesthetic. However this is not always the case, because there are also biokings, bio-queens, and female queens, which are people who perform their own biological sex through a heightened or exaggerated gender presentation.

History of drag

Ancient Greece 
The concept of drag can be seen in the earliest forms of entertainment, including Ancient Greek Theatre. In ancient western cultures, women often were not allowed to perform onstage or become actors, therefore male actors played the roles of women also. This demonstrates how female impersonation can be traced back to the earliest forms of entertainment and spectacle. Not only this, but men and boys were expected to dress as women, or in drag, for many religious ceremonies and rituals in Ancient Greece.

There is some controversy as to whether this is actually where drag emerged, or if it occurred later in history in the 1800s with forms of entertainment such as minstrel shows and Shakespeare's plays, as he often incorporated male actors as female impersonators.

United Kingdom 
In the late 1800s to the mid-1900s, pantomime dames became a popular form of female impersonation in Europe. This was the first era of female impersonation in Europe to use comedy as part of the performance, contrasting with the serious Shakespearean tragedies and Italian operas. The dame became a stock character with a range of attitudes from "charwoman" to "grande dame" that mainly was used for improvisation. The most famous and successful pantomime dame was Dan Leno. After World War I and World War II, the theatre and movie scenes were changing, and the use of pantomime dames declined. Pantomime, complete with dames, remains a popular form of theatre - traditionally performed at Christmas and afterwards - to family audiences.

Beyond theatre, in the 1800s, Molly houses became a place for gay men to meet, often dressed in drag. Despite gayness being outlawed, men would dress in women's clothing and attend these taverns and coffee houses to congregate and meet with other queer people (mostly gay men).

South Africa 
Drag in South Africa emerged in the 1950s in major cities such as Johannesburg and Cape Town. It started in the form of underground pageants which created a safe space for members of the LGBTQ community in Apartheid South Africa, where people could be punished by law for being gay. Being gay wasn't legalized in South Africa until 1998, so pageants, such as the famous Miss Gay Western Cape, did not become official until the late 1990s.

Today, homophobia is still incredibly rampant in South Africa, and drag queens face the threat of violence by being openly gay. Furthermore, there isn't even the right language to explore queerness as there is no word for it in Xhosa, one of the indigenous languages of South Africa.

Thailand 
After homosexual acts were decriminalized in Thailand in 1956, gay clubs and other queer spaces began opening which lead to the first cabaret. However, drag in Thailand was actually heavily influenced by drag queens from the Philippines as the first drag show started after the owner of a gay club saw drag queens from the Philippines perform in Bangkok. Therefore, drag shows started in Thailand in the mid 1970s and have become increasingly popular over time, especially in major cities like Bangkok.

Philippines 
Before being colonized by Spain in the mid 1500s, it was a national custom for men to dress in women's clothing. However, when the Spaniards arrived, they not only outlawed homosexuality but executed men that appeared to be homosexual. Spain cast a culture of Machismo onto the Philippines, causing any kind of queerness and queer culture to be heavily suppressed.

Nonetheless, in the early 1900s drag started to reappear in the media. Drag became a key element of national pantomime theatre and as time went on, drag queens appeared in other forms of theatre and in movies.

Canada 
In the 1940s John Herbert, who sometimes competed in drag pageants, was the victim of an attempted robbery while he was dressed as a woman. His assailants falsely claimed that Herbert had solicited them for sex, and Herbert was accused and convicted of indecency under Canada's same-sex sexual activity law (which was not repealed until 1969). After being convicted, Herbert served time in a youth reformatory in Guelph, Ontario. Herbert later served another sentence for indecency at reformatory in Mimico. Herbert wrote Fortune and Men's Eyes in 1964 based on his time behind bars. He included the character of Queenie as an authorial self-insertion.

In 1973 the first Canadian play about and starring a drag queen, Hosanna by Michel Tremblay, was performed at Théâtre de Quat'Sous in Montreal.
 	
In 1977 the Canadian film Outrageous!, starring drag queen Craig Russell, became one of the first gay-themed films to break out into mainstream theatrical release.
 	
In 1980, for the first time, a police presence protected gay spectators and drag queens from anti-gay harassment at the annual Hallowe'en show at Toronto's St. Charles Tavern.

India 

In September 2018, the Supreme Court of India ruled that the application of Section 377 of the Indian Penal Code to consensual homosexual sex between adults was unconstitutional, "irrational, indefensible and manifestly arbitrary". Since then, drag culture in India has been growing and becoming the mainstream art culture. The hotel chain of Lalit Groups spaced a franchise of clubs where drag performances are hosted in major cities of India such as Mumbai, Delhi and Bangalore. 

Maya the drag queen, Rani Kohinoor (Sushant Divgikar), Lush Monsoon, Betta Naan Stop, Tropical Marca, Zeeshan Ali and Patruni Sastry are some of the Indian drag artists. In 2018, Hyderabad had its first Drag Con. In 2020, India's First Drag specific Magazine Dragvanti was started.

United States

First drag balls 
The first person known to describe himself as "the queen of drag" was William Dorsey Swann, born enslaved in Hancock, Maryland, who in the 1880s started hosting drag balls in Washington, DC attended by other men who were formerly enslaved, and often raided by the police, as documented in the newspapers. In 1896, Swann was convicted and sentenced to 10 months in jail on the false charge of "keeping a disorderly house" (euphemism for running a brothel) and requested a pardon from the president for holding a drag ball (the request was denied).

Minstrel shows 
The evolution of drag in the United States was influenced by the phenomenon of the minstrel show. These shows were an example of how Blackface was used in a racist form of entertainment where the performers would mock African American men, but as time went on they found it amusing to mock African American women as well. They performed in comedic skits, dances, and "wench" songs. Black people themselves were excluded from being performers as at this point in history, Black people were still enslaved in the United States. Black face in minstrel shows emerged in circa 1820, but became more established with the creation of the character of "Jim Crow", which was first performed in 1828. After the Civil War, performance troupes began to be composed of Black performers. The shows maintained popularity in American entertainment into the 1920s.

Vaudeville and female impersonators 

The broad comedic stylings of the minstrel shows helped develop the vaudeville shows of the late 1800s to the early 1900s. In addition to the "wench players", minstrel shows developed the role of "prima donnas", who appeared more elegant and refined while still retaining their comedic elements.  While the "wenches" were purely American creations, the "prima donnas" were inspired by both American and European cross-dressing shows, like Shakespearean actors and castrati. With the United States shifting demographics, including the shift from farms to cities, Great Migration of African Americans, and an influx of immigrants, vaudeville's broad comedy and music expanded the audience from minstrelsy.

With vaudeville becoming more popular, it allowed female impersonators to become popular as well. Many female impersonators started with low comedy in vaudeville and worked their way up to perform as the prima donna. They were known to perform song and dance routines with multiple outfit changes. In New York City, famous female impersonator Julian Eltinge found success, and he eventually made his way to the Broadway stage performing as a woman. 

He published a magazine, Magazine and Beauty Hints (1913), which provided beauty and fashion tips, and he posed for corset and cosmetics advertisements. Meanwhile, in San Francisco, Bothwell Browne was the top female impersonator of the West Coast. He performed at the Grand Opera House and Central Theater, among other venues, went on tour with United Vaudeville, and later appeared in the film Yankee Doodle in Berlin (1919), produced by Mack Sennett.

At this time being a female impersonator was seen as something for the straight white male, and any deviation was punished. Connection with sex work and homosexuality eventually led to the decline of vaudeville during the Progressive Era. Both the minstrelsy and vaudeville eras of female impersonation led to an association with music, dance, and comedy that still lasts today.

Night clubs 
In the early to mid-1900s, female impersonation had become tied to the LGBT community and thus criminality, so it had to change forms and locations.  It moved from being popular mainstream entertainment to something done only at night in disreputable areas, such as San Francisco's Tenderloin.  Here female impersonation started to evolve into what we today know as drag and drag queens.  Drag queens such as José Sarria and Aleshia Brevard first came to prominence in these clubs.  People went to these nightclubs to play with the boundaries of gender and sexuality and it became a place for the LGBT community, especially gay men, to feel accepted. 

As LGBT culture has slowly become more accepted in American society, drag has also become more, though not totally, acceptable in today's society. In the 1940s and 1950s, Arthur Blake was one of the few female impersonators to be successful in both gay and mainstream entertainment, becoming famous for his impersonations of Bette Davis, Carmen Miranda, and Eleanor Roosevelt in night clubs. At the invitation of the Roosevelts, he performed his impersonation of Eleanor at the White House. He impersonated Davis and Miranda in the 1952 film Diplomatic Courier.

Protests 

The Cooper Donuts Riot was a May 1959 incident in Los Angeles in which drag queens, lesbians, transgender women, and gay men rioted; it was one of the first LGBT protests in the United States.

The Compton's Cafeteria riot, which involved drag queens and others, occurred in San Francisco in 1966. It marked the beginning of transgender activism in San Francisco.

On 17 March 1968, in Los Angeles, to protest entrapment and harassment by the Los Angeles Police Department, two drag queens known as "The Princess" and "The Duchess" held a St. Patrick's Day party at Griffith Park, a popular cruising spot and a frequent target of police activity. More than 200 gay men socialized through the day.

Drag queens were also involved in the Stonewall riots, a series of spontaneous, violent demonstrations by members of the LGBT community against a police raid that took place in the early morning hours of 28 June 1969, at the Stonewall Inn, located in the Greenwich Village neighborhood of Manhattan, New York City. The riots are widely considered to be the catalyst for the gay liberation movement and the modern fight for LGBT rights in the United States.

During the summer of 1976, a restaurant in Fire Island Pines, New York, denied entry to a visitor in drag named Terry Warren. When Warren's friends in Cherry Grove heard what had happened, they dressed up in drag, and, on 4 July 1976, sailed to the Pines by water taxi. This turned into a yearly event where drag queens go to the Pines, called the Invasion of the Pines.

Politics 
In 1961, drag queen José Sarria ran for the San Francisco Board of Supervisors, becoming the first openly gay candidate for public office in the United States.

In 2019, Maebe A. Girl became the first drag queen elected to public office in the United States when she was elected to the Silver Lake Neighborhood Council.

Drag Families 

Drag families are a part of ball culture and drag 'houses. In  ball culture, drag queens usually all share the same last name of the drag house or drag family they belong to. Members of a drag house may live together, but are called families because of the values of support and community in drag culture. It is also rooted in the concept of 'chosen family' as queer people have been historically disowned or outcast by their relatives and so find love and camaraderie in the LGBTQ+ community, which is especially true for those in the drag community.

Drag Mother 
A drag queen may either pick a drag name, or be given it by a friend or a"drag mother". Drag mothers often come to lead their drag house, or start their own, and are more experienced and acclaimed members of the drag community. As such, drag mothers and drag daughters have a mentor-apprentice relationship. This is because drag mothers help hone the skills of their younger queens, or drag daughters, by teaching them things such as how to apply makeup, walk in heels, sew clothing, dance, sing etc. In addition to this, drag mothers also promote their drag children at events and performances.

Art of drag 

The process of getting into drag or into character can take hours. A drag queen may aim for a certain style, celebrity impression, or message with their look. Hair, make-up, and costumes are the most important essentials for drag queens.  Drag queens tend to go for a more exaggerated look with a lot more makeup than a typical woman would wear.

Some people do drag simply as a means of self-expression, but often drag queens (once they have completed a look) will go out to clubs and bars and perform in a "drag show."  Many drag queens dress up for money by doing different shows, but there are also drag queens that have full-time jobs but still enjoy dressing up in drag as a hobby.

Many parts of the drag show, and of the drag queens' other intellectual properties, cannot be protected by intellectual property law. To substitute the lack of legal protection, drag queens revert to social norms in order to protect their intellectual property.

In entertainment

Drag shows and venues 

A drag show is a piece of entertainment consisting of a variety of songs, monologues or skits featuring either single performers or groups of performers in drag meant to entertain an audience. They range from amateur performances at small bars to elaborately staged theatrical presentations. Many drag shows feature performers singing or lip-synching to songs while performing a pre-planned pantomime, or dancing. The performers often don elaborate costumes and makeup, and sometimes dress to imitate various famous female singers or personalities. Some events are centered around drag, such as Southern Decadence where the majority of festivities are led by the Grand Marshals, who are traditionally drag queens.

In 2020 the first West End play to feature an all drag cast, Death Drop, launched at the Garrick Theatre in London. Produced by Tuckshop and Trafalgar Entertainment it was written by drag performer Holly Stars and starred Courtney Act, Monet X Change, Latrice Royale, Willam, Holly Stars, Anna Phylactic, LoUis CYfer, Don One, Kemah Bob, Myra Dubois and Vinegar Strokes and was directed by Jesse Jones. The show ran for a number of weeks in November and December 2020 before being closed due to a COVID lockdown in London. The show reopened on 19 May 2021 and ran until its scheduled end date of 11 July 2021. Death Drop received 5-star reviews from many publications including Gay Times and Attitude magazine and was widely celebrated for breaking new ground in theatrical drag performance.

In music 

While some male music celebrities wear exaggerated feminine clothing as part of their show, they are not necessarily drag queens. For example, Boy George wears drag queen style clothes and cosmetics but he once stated he was not a drag queen. However, RuPaul is a professional drag queen performer and singer.

Examples of songs where lyrics refer to drag queens:
 "Lola" by The Kinks (or possibly a transgender woman)
 "Dude (Looks Like a Lady)" by Aerosmith
 "The Lady Is a Vamp" by Spice Girls
 "Ballad of Cleo and Joe" by Cyndi Lauper
 "King for a Day" by Green Day
 "Cherry Lips" by Garbage
 "Born This Way" by Lady Gaga
 "Verbatim" by Mother Mother
 "He's a Woman, She's a Man" by Scorpions
 "Pretty Lady" by Ke$ha & Detox Icunt
 "Andrew in Drag" by The Magnetic Fields
 "Rise Like a Phoenix" by Conchita Wurst (represented Austria at the 2014 Eurovision Song Contest and won)
 "Divine" by Antony and the Johnsons
 "The End." from the album The Black Parade by My Chemical Romance
 "Drag Queen" by The Strokes
 "LGBT" by cupcaKke
 "C.L.A.T" by Aja, Peppermint, Sasha Velour and Alexis Michelle

In television 

Drag queen Don McLean (drag name Lori Shannon) appeared in three episodes of the CBS sitcom All in the Family as drag queen Beverly LaSalle: "Archie the Hero" (1975), in which Archie Bunker gives her mouth-to-mouth resuscitation, not realizing she is male; "Beverly Rides Again" (1976), in which Archie uses her to play a practical joke on a friend; and "Edith's Crisis of Faith, Part 1" (1977), in which her murder leads Edith Bunker to question her faith in God. The role was noteworthy for its uncommonly respectful and sympathetic treatment of Beverly as a "transvestite".

British entertainer Paul O'Grady was a staple of light entertainment and variety shows on UK television from the early 80s to the mid 90s playing the drag persona Lily Savage: an over the top, glamorous diva character for comedic effect.

CODCO was a Canadian sketch comedy series which aired on CBC Television from 1988 to 1993; two of its actors, Tommy Sexton and Greg Malone, were especially renowned for drag-based impersonations of celebrity women such as Queen Elizabeth, Barbara Frum, Barbara Walters, Tammy Faye Bakker and Margaret Thatcher. In one famous sketch, Malone as Frum moderated a debate between Andy Jones as a gay teacher who had been fired from his job for testing HIV-positive and Sexton as Clarabelle Otterhead, the president of an anti-gay lobby group called Citizens Outraged by Weird Sex (or COWS).

What Would You Do?, airing since early 2008, has had episodes featuring drag queens.

In mid-2008, RuPaul began producing RuPaul's Drag Race, a reality television game show which began airing in February 2009. The premise of the program has several drag queens compete to be selected by RuPaul and a panel of judges as "America's next drag superstar". It inspired the similar spin-off shows RuPaul's Drag U and RuPaul's Drag Race: All Stars, as well as the international franchise editions Drag Race Thailand, The Switch Drag Race (Chile), RuPaul's Drag Race UK, Canada's Drag Race, Drag Race Holland, Drag Race España and RuPaul's Drag Race Down Under.

In 2018, American Idol featured a drag queen, Adam Sanders (drag name Ada Vox) as one of its contestants. He made it to the top ten.

In 2018, Celebrity Big Brother featured Queen Shane Jenek (drag name Courtney Act) as one of its contestants, placing first in the season with 49.43% of the public vote.

Also in 2018, So You Think You Can Dance featured Jay Jackson (drag name Laganja Estranja) as one of its contestants.

The Netflix show Dancing Queen, also released in 2018, starred Justin Johnson (drag name Alyssa Edwards) and his dance studio, Beyond Belief Dance Company.

A 2018 episode of The Simpsons, titled "Werking Mom", featured many drag queens, including cameos from RuPaul and Raja (the season three winner of RuPaul's Drag Race).

Dragnificent! is a television series on the American network TLC. The show started as a special branded as Drag Me Down the Aisle which aired on 9 March 2019. It features Alexis Michelle, BeBe Zahara Benet, Jujubee, and Thorgy Thor, four drag queens who are all RuPaul's Drag Race alumnae, helping an engaged woman to plan her upcoming wedding. On 15 January 2020, TLC announced that it had given a full season run to Dragnificent!, a new show to be based on the Drag Me Down the Aisle special. The series premiered on 19 April 2020.
 	
The Netflix show AJ and the Queen, released in 2020, followed "Ruby Red, a bigger-than-life but down-on-her-luck drag queen [played by RuPaul] who travels across America from club to club in a rundown 1990s R/V with her unlikely sidekick AJ, a recently orphaned, tough-talking, scrappy ten-year-old stowaway. As the two misfits travel from city to city, Ruby's message of love and acceptance winds up touching people and changing their lives for the better."
 	
In 2020 RuPaul became the first drag queen to host Saturday Night Live, though he was not in drag at the time.

In 2020-21 British drag queen Holly Stars wrote and performed in two seasons of a mockumentary series, Holly Stars: Inspirational, broadcast on OutTV, Froot TV and Amazon Prime.

In education 
While drag queens are entertainers, they play a role in educating people on gender roles and stereotyping. Professor Stephen Schacht of Plattsburgh State University of New York began introducing his and his students' experiences of attending a drag show to his gender/sexualities class to challenge his students' ideas of dichotomy. Over time he began inviting students to attend with him. He gathered from his students that after attending the drag show they had a new appreciation for gender and sexuality and often become very vocal about their new experiences in the classroom.

With children 
Nina West, Drag Race season eleven contestant and winner of Miss Congeniality, and producer of Drag Is Magic, an EP of children's music about the art form, says she hopes to inspire them to "dream big, be kind, and be their perfect selves." West feels the art form is "an opportunity for children to get creative and think outside the boxes us silly adults have crafted for them." Marti Gould Cummings said something similar when a video of them performing "Baby Shark" at a drag brunch event went viral. "Anyone who thinks drag isn't for children is wrong," said Cummings, "Drag is expression, and children are such judgment-free beings; they don't really care what you're wearing, just what you're performing." As of May 2019, the video has been viewed over 806,000 times.

West responded to critics who question if children are too young to experience drag, saying "Drag is an opportunity for anyone – including and especially children – to reconsider the masks we are all forced to wear daily." West added, "Children are inundated with implicit imagery from media about what is 'boy' and what is 'girl.' And I believe that almost all kids are really less concerned about playing with a toy that's supposedly aligned to their gender, and more concerned with playing with toys that speak to them."

John Casey, an adjunct professor at Wagner College in New York City, posits in The Advocate,

Separately from kids watching drag, the phenomena of drag kids is relatively recent, The New York Times notes that as of September 2019 there are over a hundred public drag children in the U.S., with Desmond is Amazing as the one with the most followers. The mainstream access to drag queens on television exponentially increased in 2009 when RuPaul's Drag Race started airing.

However, as of 2022, exposing kids to drag has become somewhat controversial. Lawmakers in states such has Florida, Arizona, Texas are attempting to ban minors from attending drag shows and punish parents who expose their kids to drag. These attempts to ban minors from watching drag are based on allegations of drag being a form of perversion and hyper-sexualization. Those who disagree have argued that drag queens provide a safe and creative environment for young children, especially LGBTQ+ children, and are a source of both education and entertainment.

Story time in libraries 
In December 2015, Radar Productions and Michelle Tea developed the concept of Drag Queen Story Hour. Launched at the San Francisco Public Library, Drag Queen Story Hour was adopted by the Brooklyn Public Library in the summer of 2016, and has since traveled to various libraries, museums, bookstores, and recreation centers, and parks across the United States, Canada, and the United Kingdom.  

Such events sometimes prompt opposition against the libraries and organizers. In one instance in California, men belonging to the far-right group known as the Proud Boys arrived in a group and disrupted the event by shouting homophobic and transphobic phrases at the crowd. The County Sheriff's Office opened a hate crime investigation into the incident due to the nature of the disruption.

Societal reception 
Drag has come to be a celebrated and important aspect of modern gay life, but has also been criticized for degrading women. In the era of second-wave feminism some women "were angry and appalled by what they perceived as the charade of femininity expressed by some drag queens and transsexual women." These critics compared drag to blackface and saw it "as a kind of gender minstrel."

Many gay bars and clubs around the world hold drag shows as regular events or for special parties. Several "International Drag Day" holidays have been started over the years to promote the shows. In the United States Drag Day is typically celebrated in early March.

A televised drag competition, RuPaul's Drag Race, is the most successful program on the Logo television network. In 2016, the show won a Primetime Emmy Award for Outstanding Host for a Reality or Reality-Competition Program. In 2018, the show became the first show to win a Primetime Emmy Award for Outstanding Reality-Competition Program and a Primetime Emmy Award for Outstanding Host for a Reality or Reality-Competition Program in the same year.

RuPaul received a star on the Hollywood Walk of Fame for his contributions to the television industry on 16 March 2018, making him the first drag queen to be given such an award.

See also 

 Ball culture
 Cover Girl (TV series)
 Cross-dressing
 Crossplay (cosplay)
 Drag king
 Drag pageantry
 Faux queen
 Finocchio's Club
 Imperial Court System
 Kiki DuRane
 List of drag queens
 List of drag queens from New York City
 List of transgender-related topics
 Pansy Craze
 Sisters of Perpetual Indulgence
 The Adventures of Priscilla, Queen of the Desert
 The Pink Mirror, a film on Indian drag queens
 Vegas in Space
 Wanda Wisdom
 Wild Side Story

 Köçek

Notes

References

Further reading 
  - 10.1086/667199

External links 

 Drag Artist Discography (information and discography with historical references and photos) of drag artists & female impersonators
 The Pink Mirror – a film on Indian drag queens

Drag (clothing)
 
Female impersonators
Gay effeminacy
Performance art
Popular culture language
Sexuality-related lists